Creole Maid (foaled 1935 in Kentucky) was an American Thoroughbred racemare owned by Sarah F. Jeffords and trained by National Museum of Racing and Hall of Fame inductee, Preston Burch.

A granddaughter of Man o' War, Creole Maid won important races such as the 1937 Schuylerville Stakes, the 1937 Adirondack Handicap,
 and as a three-year-old in 1938, the very important Coaching Club American Oaks.

After retiring from racing, Creole Maid served as a broodmare for her owner and notably produced the fast colt, Natchez.

References

1935 racehorse births
Thoroughbred family 4-n
Racehorses bred in Kentucky
Racehorses trained in the United States